Peder Pedersen is the name of:

Peder Pedersen (director) (born 1971)
Peder Oluf Pedersen (1874–1941), Danish engineer and physicist
Peder Ree Pedersen (1913–1976), Norwegian politician
Peder Pedersen (musician), full name Peder Thomas Pedersen, Danish musician, see Danish Music Awards
Peder Larsen Pedersen (1880–1966), Danish gymnast
Peder Pedersen (cyclist) (1945–2015), represented Denmark at the 1972 Summer Olympics

See also
Peter Pedersen (disambiguation)
Petter Pedersen (disambiguation)